New Joc City is the debut album by American rapper Yung Joc. It features the hit songs "I Know You See It" and "It's Goin' Down" which was produced by Nitti and reached number three on the Billboard Hot 100.

Commercial performance
New Joc City was released in the United States on June 6, 2006 by Atlantic Records. It debuted at #3 on the Billboard 200 with over 150,000 copies sold in the first week. On August 11, 2006, the RIAA certified the album Gold for selling 500,000 copies.

Reception

Reviews for this album were mixed. Rating the album "L" (in its five-level clothing size rating system from "S" to "XXL"), XXL described "Dope Boy Magic" as having "endless head-turning punch lines...with different sequential number combinations" but described the tracks as "go[ing] in cliché circles" with "[c]orny brand-name drops." In a three-star (out of five) review, David Jeffries of AllMusic described the album as having an "identity crisis" due to tracks that he found "less convincing" than the "safe and tested surroundings" of "It's Goin' Down" and "I Know You See It." The Atlanta Journal-Constitution, based in Yung Joc's hometown, graded the album "C+", describing lead single "It's Goin' Down" as "simple...[but] infectious" while finding a lack of "a new, exciting reserve of wordplay and delivery." RapReviews found other tracks such as "Don't Play Wit It" to be better choices as a lead single.

For HipHopDX, Brian Sims rated New Joc City two out of five ("aluminum") due to what he called "reused lines" and a "dull mood plaguing most of the album." Sims compared Yung Joc's rapping style on "It's Goin' Down" to "a senior citizen on the MARTA," describing the song as "bar after monotonous bar." Tom Breihan of Pitchfork described the album as having "no visible identity of purpose" and "bargain-basement minimal snap stuff."

Track listing

Leftover tracks
"Take Off Your Pimps" (featuring Potzee & Starr) (produced by J. R. Rotem)
"A Couple Grand"

Charts

Weekly charts

Year-end charts

Certifications

References

2006 debut albums
Yung Joc albums
Bad Boy Records albums